Hardware may refer to:

Technology

Computing and electronics
 Electronic hardware, interconnected electronic components which perform analog or logic operations
 Digital electronics, electronics that operate on digital signals
 Computer hardware, physical parts of a computer
 Networking hardware, devices that enable use of a computer network
 Electronic component, device in an electronic system used to affect electrons, usually industrial products

Other technologies
 Household hardware, equipment used for home repair and other work, such as fasteners, wire, plumbing supplies, electrical supplies, utensils, and machine parts
Builders hardware, metal hardware for building fixtures, such as hinges and latches
 Hardware (development cooperation), in technology transfer
 Drum hardware, used to tension, position, and support the instruments
 Military technology, application of technology to warfare
 Music hardware, devices other than instruments to create music

Entertainment
 Hardware (album), by the heavy metal band Krokus
 Hardware (Billy Gibbons album), released in 2021
 Hardware (band), consisting of Bootsy Collins, Buddy Miles, and Stevie Salas
 Hardware (character), a character from Milestone Comics
 Hardware (film), a 1990 film
 Hardware (TV series), a British situation comedy
 Hardware: Online Arena, a 2002 video game
 "Hardware", a 1987 science fiction story by Robert Silverberg

Other uses
 Hardware, Virginia, an unincorporated community in Fluvanna County, Virginia

See also
 Hardware acceleration, the speedup of computing tasks by performing them in customized hardware rather than software
 Hardware architecture, the identification of a system's physical components and their interrelationships
 Hardware engineering, or computer engineering
 Ware (disambiguation)
 Open-source hardware
 Hardware store, a business which sells household hardware
 Materiel, equipment or hardware, and supplies in military and commercial supply chain management
 Medals
 Trophies
 Software
 Open-source software